Vinko Kraljević (born 16 March 1952) is a Croatian actor. He appeared in more than fifty films since 1976.

Selected filmography

References

External links 

1952 births
Living people
Croats of Bosnia and Herzegovina
People from Široki Brijeg
Croatian male film actors